Târgu Bujor is a town in Galați County, Romania. It administers two villages, Moscu and Umbrărești. It is situated in the historical region of Western Moldavia.

Natives
Iulian-Gabriel Bîrsan (1956–2022), engineer and politician
Eremia Grigorescu (1863–1919), general during World War I and Minister of War in 1918
 (1933–1985), poet

Climate

Târgu Bujor's climate is humid continental (Dfb).

References

Populated places in Galați County
Towns in Romania
Localities in Western Moldavia